The third Fraser ministry (Liberal–National Country coalition) was the 52nd ministry of the Government of Australia. It was led by the country's 22nd Prime Minister, Malcolm Fraser. The third Fraser ministry succeeded the second Fraser ministry, which dissolved on 20 December 1977 following the federal election that took place on 10 December. The ministry was replaced by the fourth Fraser ministry on 3 November 1980 following the 1980 federal election.

As of 26 January 2023, John Howard and Ian Viner are the last surviving Liberal members of the Cabinet of the third Fraser ministry, while Ian Sinclair and Peter Nixon are the last surviving NCP members.

Cabinet

Outer ministry

See also
 First Fraser ministry
 Second Fraser ministry
 Fourth Fraser ministry

Notes

Ministries of Elizabeth II
1970s in Australia
1977 establishments in Australia
1980 disestablishments in Australia
Fraser, 3
Cabinets established in 1977
Cabinets disestablished in 1980
Ministry, Fraser 3